The Vietnamese calendar (Hán-Nôm: 陰曆) is a lunisolar calendar that is mostly based on the lunisolar Chinese calendar. As Vietnam's official calendar has been the Gregorian calendar since 1954, the Vietnamese calendar is used mainly to observe lunisolar holidays and commemorations, such as Tết Nguyên Đán and Tết Trung Thu.

Historical developments 

After Vietnam regained independence following the third Chinese dominion of Viet-Nam, monarchs established their own calendars based on Chinese prototypes, and every subsequent dynasty had appointed officers to man and create the calendar to be used in the realm. According to the Đại Việt sử lược historical chronicles, the Vietnamese rulers started building astronomical/astrological facilities in the capital Thăng Long (Chữ Hán: 昇龍; i.e. modern Hanoi) as early as 1029. Beginning in 1324, the Chinese Yuan dynasty introduced the Thụ Thời calendar to the Vietnamese Trần dynasty.

Beginning in 1954, Vietnamese administrative offices officially used the Gregorian calendar, while the civilian populace continued to use a variety of local calendars derived from French, Chinese and Japanese sources, including the Hiệp Kỷ calendar. On 8 August 1967, the North Vietnamese government issued a decree to change Vietnamese standard time from UTC+8 to UTC+7, as well as make the Gregorian calendar the sole official calendar, restricting lunisolar calendar use to holidays and commemorations. South Vietnam would later join this change at the end of the Vietnam War in 1975.

Differences from the Chinese calendar 

The Chinese calendar is based on astronomical observations and is therefore dependent on what is considered the local standard time. North Vietnam switched from UTC+8 to UTC+7 on 8 August 1967, with South Vietnam doing likewise in 1975 at the end of the Vietnam War. As a result of the shift, North and South Vietnam celebrated Tết 1968 on different days. This effect would see the solstice falling on 21 December in Hanoi, while it was 22 December for Beijing.

As the 11th month of the Chinese calendar must contain the winter solstice, it is not the month from 23 November 1984 to 21 December 1984 as per the Vietnamese calendar, but rather the one from 22 December 1984 to 20 January 1985. The effect of this is that the Vietnamese New Year would fall on 21 January 1985, whereas the Chinese New Year would fall on 20 February 1985, a one-month difference. The two calendars agreed again after a leap month lasting from 21 March to 19 April of that year was inserted into the Vietnamese calendar.

In the Vietnamese zodiac, the cat replaces the Rabbit in the Chinese zodiac. So, a child born in the Chinese year of the Rabbit will be born in the Vietnamese year of the Cat (mẹo/mão).  The Vietnamese zodiac uses the same animals as the Chinese zodiac for the remaining 11 years, though the Ox of the Chinese zodiac is usually considered to be a water buffalo (sửu/trâu) in the Vietnamese zodiac.

Gallery

See also 

 Chinese zodiac
 Lunar calendar
 Lunisolar calendar

References 

Time in Vietnam
Lunisolar calendars
Specific calendars
Vietnamese culture